This is a list of RPM's number one weekly Alternative Rock singles chart in Canada for 1996.  This chart was first published 11 June 1995 as the Alternative 30 by RPM magazine.  In early 1999, the magazine renamed the chart to Rock Report.  This chart was published most weeks until the magazine's demise 13 November 2000.

RPM's number one Alternative rock single for 1996, as published in their chart "Year End Alternative ~ Top 50", was Soundgarden's "Burden in My Hand".

Weekly chart

See also

List of number-one singles (Canada)

References
Notes

Citations

External links
 Read about RPM Magazine at the AV Trust
 Search RPM charts here at Library and Archives Canada

RPM (magazine) charts
1996 record charts
Lists of number-one songs in Canada
1996 in Canadian music